Baron Castletown, of Upper Ossory in the Queen's County, was a title in the Peerage of the United Kingdom. It was created on 10 December 1869 for John FitzPatrick, the former Liberal Member of Parliament for Queen's County. He was the illegitimate son of John FitzPatrick, 2nd Earl of Upper Ossory.

The barony became extinct upon the death of his son, the 2nd Baron, on 29 May 1937. He had married Hon. Ursula Emily Clare St. Leger, daughter of the fourth Viscount Doneraile, but they had no children

Barons Castletown (1869)
John Wilson FitzPatrick, 1st Baron Castletown (1811–1883)
Bernard Edward Barnaby FitzPatrick, 2nd Baron Castletown (1849–1937)

See also
Earl of Upper Ossory

References

External links

The Fitzpatrick – Mac Giolla Phádraig Clan Society
 Fitzpatrick Arms, Crests, Mottos and Supporters by Ronan Fitzpatrick
 Descendants of Bryan Fitzpatrick, Lord and First Baron of Upper Ossory by Ronan Fitzpatrick and Steve Zalewski
The Fitzpatrick Mythology by John Hylas Smith

Extinct baronies in the Peerage of the United Kingdom
Noble titles created in 1869
Noble titles created for UK MPs
FitzPatrick dynasty